Dean Garnier may refer to:

 Thomas Garnier (dean of Winchester) (father)
 Thomas Garnier (Dean of Lincoln) (son)